MicMac is an open source software for photogrammetry developed by the French National Geographic Institute.

See also
Comparison of photogrammetry software

References

External links
Official website
Citations of Rupnik et al. (2017).

Photogrammetry software
Free and open-source software